The sargo or white seabream (Diplodus sargus) is a species of seabream native to the eastern Atlantic and western Indian Oceans. It is found from the Bay of Biscay southwards to South Africa, including Madeira and the Canary Islands, the Mediterranean and (rarely) the Black Sea. Occasionally individuals are found off the Indian Ocean coasts of South Africa, Mozambique and Madagascar, and they are very rarely found elsewhere in the Indian Ocean, such as off Oman. An active fish, they inhabit the surf zone, but they may be found down to 50 m.
 
They consume small crustaceans, mollusks and some seaweed and coral, using their strong jaws to crush shells. Individuals can reach 45 cm, but average 22 cm.

Diplodus sargus are protandrous hermaphrodites, with individuals starting out life as males, and some becoming female later on.

It is commercially fished, with 3,713 t taken in 2008. Some are reared using aquacultural techniques. The catch is eaten immediately or marketed locally, as the flesh tastes good only when fresh.

Subspecies
The species has one accepted subspecies:
Diplodus sargus cadenati (de la Paz, et al., 1974), occurs off the European and West African coasts, and off Madeira and the Canary Islands

Other former subspecies have been accepted as separate species:
Diplodus sargus ascensionis: as Diplodus ascensionis (Valenciennes, 1830)
Diplodus sargus capensis: as Diplodus capensis (Smith, 1846)
Diplodus sargus helenae: as Diplodus helenae (Sauvage, 1879)
Diplodus sargus kotschyi: as Diplodus kotschyi (Steindachner, 1876)
Diplodus sargus lineatus: as Diplodus lineatus (Valenciennes, 1830)

References

External links

 Diplodus sargus at the Encyclopedia of Life
 
 
 

Diplodus
Commercial fish
Sport fish
Fish of the East Atlantic
Fish of the Mediterranean Sea
Marine fish of Europe
Marine fish of Africa
Fish described in 1758
Taxa named by Carl Linnaeus